Wonder Woman is a 1974 American made-for-television superhero film based on the DC Comics character of the same name, directed by Vincent McEveety and starring Cathy Lee Crosby. The film was a pilot for an intended television series being considered by ABC. The film presented the character as a James Bond–style superspy, and did not contain many elements from the comic book series. Ratings were described as "respectable but not exactly wondrous" and ABC did not pick up the pilot.

Instead, Warner Brothers and ABC developed a different Wonder Woman television concept that fit the more traditional presentation of the character as created by William Moulton Marston, turning away from the 1968–1972 era that had influenced the pilot. The New Original Wonder Woman, which premiered in 1975, starred Lynda Carter and eventually led to the Wonder Woman TV series. Crosby would later claim that she was offered the chance to reprise the role in that series.

Background

Wonder Woman's first broadcast appearance in live-action television was a movie made in 1974 for ABC. Written by John D. F. Black, the TV movie resembles the Wonder Woman of the "I Ching" period. Wonder Woman (Cathy Lee Crosby) did not wear the comic-book uniform, demonstrated no apparent super-human powers, had a "secret identity" of Diana Prince that was not all that secret, and she was also depicted as blonde (differing from the black hair established in the comic books).

The pilot aired originally on March 12, 1974. and was repeated on August 21 of that year. Ratings were described as "respectable but not exactly wondrous". ABC did not pick up the pilot, although Crosby would later claim she was offered the series that was eventually given to Lynda Carter. An ABC spokesperson would later acknowledge that the decision to update the character was a mistake. However, DC Comics did make this version canonical in the limited run Infinite Crisis as Wonder Woman of Earth 462.

Warner Brothers released this pilot into syndication as a stand-alone 90-minute telefilm, where it played on independent TV stations throughout the 1970s and 1980s. On December 11, 2012, Warner Brothers made the Cathy Lee Crosby pilot available as a Video On Demand purchase through their online store.

Plot
This film follows Wonder Woman, assistant to government agent Steve Trevor (Kaz Garas), as she pursues a villain named Abner Smith (Ricardo Montalbán), who has stolen a set of code books containing classified information about U.S. government field agents. Along the way, she has to outwit Smith's chief assistants: the handsome yet dangerous George (Andrew Prine) and a rogue Amazon, Ahnjayla (Anitra Ford), whom Smith has taken on as a bodyguard; a brief duel between Wonder Woman and Ahnjayla is the film's only significant action sequence, which occurs during the final third of the story.

Cast

Home media
Warner Home Video released the TV film to DVD in 2012 through Amazon.com and their Warner Archive collection.

References

External links

1970s feminist films
1970s superhero films
1974 television films
1974 films
ABC Movie of the Week
American spy films
American superhero films
Television films as pilots
Television pilots not picked up as a series
Wonder Woman films
Films directed by Vincent McEveety
1970s American films